Brachyplatystoma rousseauxii, the gilded catfish or dourada, is a species of catfish of the family Pimelodidae that is native to Amazon and Orinoco River basins and major rivers of French Guiana.

Named in honor of Louis Rousseau (1811-1874), assistant naturalist, Muséum d’histoire naturelle in Paris.

Distribution
It is a much widespread species that is found in fluvial systems in the Guianas and northeastern Brazil and Amazon and Orinoco river drainage.

Description
It grows to a length of 192 cm. Body is characterized by platinum head and gold body. Adults have short barbels. Caudal-fin in adults deeply-forked with narrow lobes.

It is entirely piscivorous.

Ecology
It is a demersal fish commonly inhabits deeper, flowing channels. Juveniles and sub adults are migratory. It is considered to have the longest freshwater migration of any known fish species

References

External links
Life-history Characteristics of the Large Amazonian Migratory Catfish Brachyplatystoma Rousseauxii in the Iquitos Region, Peru
Phylogeography of Brachyplatystoma rousseauxii (Siluriformes-Pimelodidae) in the Amazon Basin offers preliminary evidence for the first case of “homing” for an Amazonian migratory catfish

Pimelodidae
Catfish of South America
Freshwater fish of Brazil
Taxa named by François-Louis Laporte, comte de Castelnau
Fish described in 1855